United Nations Security Council Resolution 169, adopted on November 24, 1961, deprecated the secessionist activities in Katanga as well as armed action against United Nations forces and insisted that those activities cease.  The council then authorized the Secretary-General to take whatever action necessary to immediately apprehend and deport all foreign military personnel, paramilitary personnel and mercenaries not with the UN and requested that the SG take all necessary measures to prevent their return.  The Council then asked all member states to aid the Government of the Republic of the Congo and to prevent any actions which might contribute to the conflict there.

The resolution passed with nine votes to none; France and the United Kingdom abstained.

See also
List of United Nations Security Council Resolutions 101 to 200 (1953–1965)
Resolutions 143, 145, 146, 157,  and 161
The Congo Crisis

References
Text of the Resolution at undocs.org

External links
 

 0169
 0169
1961 in the Republic of the Congo (Léopoldville)
Congo Crisis
State of Katanga
November 1961 events